Haruna Manu (born 23 August 1973) is a Nigerian politician, a member of the Peoples Democratic Party and a former member House of Representatives for Bali/Gassol Federal Constituency. He is the current Deputy Governor of Taraba State since May 2015.

Early life and education
Haruna was born on August 23, 1973, in Mutum-Biyu, Gassol Local Government Area of Taraba State. He has a first degree in Business Administration with specialization in Finance from the prestigious Ahmadu Bello University in Zaria, Kaduna State. He also holds a master's degree in Electronic Commerce from Carnegie Mellon University in the United States of America, and he is a certified Microsoft System Engineer. He has working experience with the Nigeria Liquefied Natural Gas (NLNG) and later worked with MTN Nigeria communication Limited before finally settling down to pioneer many start-up firms.

Political career
Haruna joined the People's Democratic Party in late 2010 and won the primary ticket for the Bali/Gassol Federal Constituency seat of the National Assembly. He won the election and represented Bali/Gassol Federal Constituency at the National House of Representatives from 2011 to 2015. He was the deputy chairman, House committee on Banking and Currency, and a member of various committees in the House of Representatives during his tenure at the National assembly.
Having served his constituency well, his performance was responsible for the decision to choose him as the running mate to Darius Dickson Ishaku on the platform of the People's Democratic Party in the 2015 general elections.

References

1973 births
Living people
People from Taraba State
Taraba State Peoples Democratic Party politicians
Ahmadu Bello University alumni